The 1937 World Fencing Championships were held in Paris, France.

Medal table

Medal summary

Men's events

Women's events

References

1937 in fencing
1937 in French sport
F
Fencing
World Fencing Championships
1937 in Paris